The Catch is an American comedy-drama television series that aired on ABC from March 24, 2016, to May 11, 2017. It stars Mireille Enos and Peter Krause, was created by Jennifer Schuur, Kate Atkinson, and Helen Gregory, and developed by Allan Heinberg, and was executive produced by Shondaland's Shonda Rhimes and Betsy Beers. Julie Anne Robinson also served as an executive producer and directed the pilot episode. The series premiered on May 12, 2016 and was renewed for a second season. The second season premiered on March 9, 2017. On May 11, 2017, ABC cancelled the series after two seasons.

Premise
The Catch follows Alice Vaughan (Enos), who runs a private investigation firm in Los Angeles, California. After being defrauded by her fiancé, she is determined to find him—between working on other cases—before it ruins her career. Her fiancé, Benjamin Jones (Krause), is revealed to be a master con artist working for a high-stakes international crime operation along with Margot Bishop (Sonya Walger). Rose Rollins, Elvy Yost, Jay Hayden, Jacky Ido, and Alimi Ballard also co-star.

Production

Development
On October 21, 2014, it was announced that ABC had bought the original concept for a drama series about a gutsy female forensic accountant, based on a treatment written by novelist Kate Atkinson. The script was written by Jennifer Schuur. The Catch is produced by Shonda Rhimes, Betsy Beers, Julie Anne Robinson, and Schuur. ABC ordered the pilot on January 26, 2015 for the 2015–16 television season. The pilot episode was filmed in Austin, Texas and was directed by Julie Anne Robinson. On May 7, 2015, ABC picked up the pilot to series.

In June 2015, it was announced The Catch would take over How to Get Away with Murders Thursday 10 ET/9 CT slot and form part of Shondaland's mid-season #TGIT block. On August 18, 2015, it was announced that the series creator Jennifer Schuur had exited the series as showrunner because of creative differences. Shondaland's Allan Heinberg, who has worked on Grey's Anatomy and Scandal, then stepped in as showrunner of The Catch.

Casting
Casting advertisement began in February 2015. On March 2, 2015, it was announced that Mireille Enos would play the leading role of Alice Vaughan. Newcomer Damon Dayoub was cast for the male leading role as Alice's fiancé, Benjamin Jones. Bethany Joy Lenz later was cast as his criminal wife, Zoe. Alan Ruck and Rose Rollins were cast as an estranged couple and friends of Alice and Alice's fiancé Benjamin's. Jacky Ido was cast as an FBI agent who becomes suspicious of Alice, along with Jay Hayden and Elvy Yost as Alice's co-workers in her forensic firm. On May 18, 2015, Lenz revealed on her WhoSay account that she was being replaced. The same day, it was announced that Damon Dayoub, the male lead, was also being replaced.

On July 14, 2015, it was reported that Peter Krause had taken over the male lead role of Benjamin Jones replacing Dayoub, who played the role in the pilot. On July 22, 2015, Sonya Walger was added to the cast as Margot Bishop, replacing Lenz. The pilot was reshot with the new cast members.

For the second season it was announced that John Simm would be upped to the series regular cast, while  Ballard and Ido would be departing the series. However, Ido returned as Jules Dao for the season 2 premiere to wrap up his character's storyline.

Cast and characters

Main cast
 Mireille Enos as Alice Vaughan
 Peter Krause as Benjamin Jones
 Sonya Walger as Margot Bishop
 Jacky Ido as FBI Special Agent Jules Dao (season 1; guest, season 2)
 Rose Rollins as Valerie Anderson
 Alimi Ballard as Reginald Lennox III (season 1)
 Jay Hayden as Danny Yoon
 Elvy Yost as Sophie Novak
 John Simm as Rhys Griffiths (season 2; recurring, season 1)

Recurring cast
 Medalion Rahimi as Zara Al-Salim (season 1)
 Alan Ruck as Gordan Bailey (season 1)
 Shivani Ghai as Felicity
 Nia Vardalos as Leah Wells (season 1)
 Caleb Smith as Agent Shawn Sullivan (season 1)
 Lesley Nicol as Sybil Griffiths
 T.R. Knight as Tommy Vaughan (season 2)
 Gina Torres as Agent Justine Diaz (season 2)
 Ismael Cruz Córdova as The Hammer (season 2)
 Warren Christie as Ethan Ward (season 2)
 Philippa Coulthard as Tessa Riley (season 2)
 Kevin Carroll as Nicholas Turner (season 2)

The Vaughan character was significantly revised after the pilot episode: instead of a Chicago-based auditor, she became a Los Angeles-based private investigator. She also became sexier: instead of being a "very guarded, lacquered ’50s-era Hitchcock presence," Vaughan became "peppier, a life-lover with mascaraed lashes and a closet filled with Bond girl minidresses." Her style is a "modernised look of the 1960s".

Broadcast
Internationally, the series premiered in Australia on the Seven Network on October 10, 2016. In the UK the show premiered on Sky Living. Since 2022, the show became available on Disney+ outside the US.

Episodes

Season 1 (2016)

Season 2 (2017)

Reception
The Catch has been met with generally positive reviews from critics, with most praising Mireille Enos' leading performance. Metacritic gave season one of the show a score of 59 out of 100 based on 30 reviews, indicating "mixed or average reviews". The review aggregator website Rotten Tomatoes reports a 72% approval rating. The site's general consensus reads:

References

External links 
 

2016 American television series debuts
2010s American comedy-drama television series
2017 American television series endings
American Broadcasting Company original programming
2010s American crime drama television series
2010s American romantic comedy television series
2010s American legal television series
2010s American LGBT-related drama television series
English-language television shows
Lesbian-related television shows
Television shows set in Los Angeles
Television series by ABC Studios
Television series by Shondaland